Maria "São" Schlumberger (15 October 192915 August 2007), was a Portuguese-born American fashion and art patron and collector, and the second wife of Pierre Schlumberger.

Early life
She was born Maria da Concerção Diniz on 15 October 1929 in Porto, Portugal. Her father was a landowner, who grew cork and olives, and her mother was a  German heiress from Hamburg - they met at the University of Coimbra. Her parents were never legally married, and she was largely raised by her Portuguese grandmother. Her maternal grandmother was Erna Schröeder. From the age of ten, she attended a Lisbon boarding school run by nuns, and in 1951, earned a degree in philosophy and history from the University of Lisbon.

Personal life
She studied psychology for three months at New York's Columbia University, and then worked as a counsellor for juvenile delinquents in Lisbon, before switching to studying art at the Museu Nacional de Arte Antiga, where she met Pedro Bessone Basto, a "boulevardier" from a wealthy family. They married in New York, and divorced in under a year.

In 1961, the Lisbon-based Gulbenkian Foundation awarded her a fellowship to research children's programs in New York museums, and once there was helped by Kay Lepercq, whose husband Paul Lepercq was an investment banker, and his clients included the Schlumberger family. After two months, Pierre Schlumberger (1914-1986) proposed and they married in 1961. His first wife, Claire Schwob d'Héricourt, with whom he had five children, died from a stroke in 1959. Pierre and  São had two children, Paul-Albert, in 1962, and Victoire, in 1968. They lived in Houston, Texas, until he was ousted as CEO in "a family coup" in 1965, and moved to New York City and then Paris.

Art patron and collector
In Paris, they lived in an 18th-century hôtel particulier in the Rue Férou, next door to Man Ray, restored by French architect Pierre Barbe, with interior design by Valerian Rybar in "a provocative mix of classic and modern styles". She regularly organised parties, ranging from formal black-tie balls to a "hot-pants party".

Schlumberger particularly liked the work of Mark Rothko, Robert Rauschenberg, and Roy Lichtenstein. Her portrait was painted by Salvador Dalí, but in 1987, she said, "I don't really like it. I was expecting a fantasy...but he did a classic". Dali also designed for her an elaborate pearl-and-emerald necklace which she often wore. Andy Warhol also painted her portrait.

She was a patron to the fashion designer John Galliano, and lent him her empty 17th-century Paris hotel particulier (which she had left for a new Right Bank apartment), for his autumn 1994 show, designed with the help of André Leon Talley, Amanda Harlech, and Steven Robinson.

Death
She died in Paris on 15 August 2007. Her funeral at Saint-Pierre-du-Gros-Caillou church in the 7th arrondissement was attended by six people, due to the city being "empty" in August: her daughter Victoire, Henri, Count of Paris, André Dunstetter, Nicholas Dadeshkeliani, the graphic artist Philippe Morillon, and Maria, her personal maid.

References

1929 births
2007 deaths
Schlumberger people
American art collectors
Women collectors
University of Lisbon alumni
People from Porto
Portuguese art collectors